Charles Ethan Billings (1834–1920) was an American mechanical engineer, inventor, superintendent, and businessman. He held various U.S. patents on hand tools, either assigned or licensed to the firm that he and Christopher M. Spencer cofounded, the Billings & Spencer Company. His name as patent holder is stamped (as C.E. Billings) on countless forged hand tools, many of which survive. Billings was an expert in drop forging and was an influential leader in the American system of manufacturing and its successor systems of mass production for firearms, sewing machines, hand tools, bicycles, and other goods. He served as president of the American Society of Mechanical Engineers in 1895 and 1896. The Billings & Spencer Company was both a machine tool builder and a manufacturer of hand tools made with its machine tools.

Biography 
He was born in Weathersfield, Vermont, the son of Ethan F. and Clarissa M. (née Marsh) Billings. He served his apprenticeship at Robbins & Lawrence in Windsor, Vermont. Robbins & Lawrence was a factory and armory that was an important early node in the social network of the 19th century machine tool industry.

In 1856, at the age of 21, he worked at the Colt armory in Hartford, Connecticut as a die sinker and tool maker and became their expert on the drop forging process. In 1862, he went to E. Remington & Sons, where he built up their forging plant, increasing its efficiency and  saving $50,000 by one improvement in frame forging alone. At the end of the American Civil War, he returned to Hartford as the superintendent of the Weed Sewing Machine Company, which had taken over the old Sharps Rifle Works, built by Robbins & Lawrence.

In 1868, while at the Roper Repeating Arms Company in Amherst, Massachusetts, he worked with Christopher M. Spencer. The Roper company failed and in 1869, the two founded a partnership in Hartford, Connecticut called Billings & Spencer, which would manufacture sewing machines, drop-forged hand tools, and machine tools. Billings perfected a drop hammer for metal forging in the 1870s and designed the copper commutator which was central to the operation of electrical generators and motors.

In 1895, Billings was president of the American Society of Mechanical Engineers.

He died on June 5, 1920 in Hartford, Connecticut and was interred at Cedar Hill Cemetery.

List of patents held
This list may not be exhaustive; if you like, you can verify its exhaustiveness with a US patent search.

References

Bibliography

External links
Biography from http://www.all-biographies.com/
Connecticut inventors

1835 births
1920 deaths
19th-century American businesspeople
19th-century American inventors
Burials at Cedar Hill Cemetery (Hartford, Connecticut)
Businesspeople from Hartford, Connecticut
People from Weathersfield, Vermont
Presidents of the American Society of Mechanical Engineers
Machine tool builders